Land of Hope: Chicago, Black Southerners, and the Great Migration is a non-fiction book by James R. Grossman, published by University of Chicago Press in 1991.

Daniel Letwin of Holy Cross College stated that this book has "much in common" with Making Their Own Way: Southern Blacks' Migration to Pittsburgh, 1916-30, although compared to the other book Land of Hope is more "comprehensive". Jon C. Teaford of Purdue University compared the work to American Exodus: The Dust Bowl Migration and Okie Culture in California, in that African-Americans saw Chicago as an important destination for similar reasons that "Okies" escaping the Dust Bowl saw California as an important destination.

Background
The research included government records, manuscripts, and other archival material.

Contents
There are two parts, with the latter describing how the Southerners had lived in Chicago.

Reception
Jacqueline A. Rouse of Georgia State University praised the descriptions of community organizing and giving agency to African-American migrants.

Clarence E. Walker of University of California, Davis wrote that the work is "thoughtful, well-researched, and provocative".

Vernon J. Williams, Jr. of Purdue University described the work as "authoritative and significant".

See also
 History of African Americans in Chicago

References

Notes

Further reading
 
 
 
  - Available at ProQuest
 
  - Available at Gale Academic Onefile

External links
 Land of Hope - University of Chicago Press

1991 non-fiction books
University of Chicago Press books